The blue-eyed spotted cuscus or Biak spotted cuscus (Spilocuscus wilsoni) is a species of critically endangered marsupial in the family Phalangeridae.

Taxonomy 
The blue-eyed spotted cuscus is one of five species of spotted cuscus in the genus Spilocuscus.

Description 
The blue-eyed spotted cuscus has a pale marbled coat with shades of brown, grey, and white with a creamy white underbelly. This species is relatively smaller in size than the other Spilocuscus cuscuses and has distinct pale blue eyes.

Distribution and habitat
The blue-eyed spotted cuscus can be found on several of the islands in the Cenderawasih Bay in West Papua of Indonesia. This region is made up of the islands Biak, Supiori, and Numfor. Despite being endemic to the islands Biak and Supiori, the blue-eyed spotted cuscus have been spotted on the island of Numfor as pets. This cuscus lives in the treetops of the tropical rainforests found throughout Supiori and Biak. Due to the rugged terrain common on the Supiori Island, it is better insulated from human foot traffic and allows for a more flourishing population than that on Biak.

Conservation
The major threats to the blue-eyed spotted cuscus include habitat loss, hunting, and collection for the exotic pet trade by locals. Due to its rarity, the blue-eyed spotted cuscus was only scientifically described in 2004 and was deemed critically endangered by the IUCN in 2015. Recent surveys have failed to find any wild individuals from Numfor and, more recently, Biak.

Currently, there are no widespread conservation efforts dedicated to protecting this species. However, 12% of its ecoregion (344km2) has been classified as protected between the three islands.

References

Possums
Mammals of Western New Guinea
Mammals described in 2004
Endemic fauna of the Biak–Numfoor rain forests
Marsupials of New Guinea